Demino is a rural locality (a village) in Kubenskoye Rural Settlement, Vologodsky District, Vologda Oblast, Russia. The population was 9 as of 2002.

Geography 
The distance to Vologda is 75 km, to Kubenskoye is 28 km. Dulovo, Yefimovo, Krivoye, Babik, Dolmatovo, Lavrentyevo, Krinki are the nearest rural localities.

References 

Rural localities in Vologodsky District